Innotek may refer to:
 Innotek (Belgium), a Belgian technology centre
 Innotek GmbH, a former German software company which created VirtualBox
 LG Innotek, a South Korean electronic component company